Refugee (Various Artists) is a collaborative charity album, curated by Scottish singer-songwriter Robin Adams.

The album was recorded to raise funds for the refugee crisis in its many forms, from Syria and beyond.  All proceeds raised by the album continue to go to MOAS (Migrant Offshore Aid Station).

The album includes original song contributions from Bonnie Prince Billy, Linda Thompson, Ricky Ross, Alasdair Roberts, Richard Dawson, BMX Bandits, Kathryn Joseph, Robin Adams and others.

Reception 
As well as raising funds for MOAS, the record was successful in raising awareness for the refugee crises, with multiple news and music publications covering the charity release.

Track listing

References 

Collaborative albums
Charity albums